2691 Sersic, provisional designation , is a stony Florian asteroid and binary system from the inner regions of the asteroid belt, approximately 6 kilometers in diameter. It was discovered by staff members at the Felix Aguilar Observatory at El Leoncito Complex in Argentina, on 18 May 1974. The asteroid was named after Argentine astronomer José Sersic.

Classification and orbit 

Sersic is a member of the Flora family, one of the largest groups of stony asteroids in the main-belt. It orbits the Sun in the inner main-belt at a distance of 2.0–2.5 AU once every 3 years and 4 months (1,228 days). Its orbit has an eccentricity of 0.11 and an inclination of 4° with respect to the ecliptic.

Physical characteristics

Diameter and albedo 

The Collaborative Asteroid Lightcurve Link assumes an albedo of 0.24 – derived from 8 Flora, the largest member and namesake of this orbital family – and calculates a diameter of 6.21 kilometers with an absolute magnitude of 13.2.

Satellite 

Sersic is a binary asteroid. A minor-planet moon, designated  was discovered in 2011 from lightcurve observations of the asteroid. It has a diameter of 2.15 ± 0.11 and an orbital period of 1 day, 2 hours, and 48 minutes.

Naming 

This minor planet was named in honor of José Luis Sersic (1933–1993), well known for his work in extragalactic astronomy and on supernovae (also see Sersic's law and ). He has served as director of the Córdoba Observatory. The approved naming citation was published by the Minor Planet Center on 20 February 1989.

References

External links 
 Asteroids with Satellites, Robert Johnston, johnstonsarchive.net
 Asteroid Lightcurve Database (LCDB), query form (info )
 Dictionary of Minor Planet Names, Google books
 Asteroids and comets rotation curves, CdR – Observatoire de Genève, Raoul Behrend
 Discovery Circumstances: Numbered Minor Planets (1)-(5000) – Minor Planet Center
 
 

Flora asteroids
Discoveries by the Félix Aguilar Observatory
Sersic
Binary asteroids
19740518